Thomas Savill Gipps (1888 – 7 January 1956) was an English professional football half back who played in the Football League for Manchester United.

Personal life 
Gipps brother was also a footballer. In mid-1916, during the middle of the First World War, Gipps enlisted as a private in the Army Service Corps.

Career statistics

References

External links
MUFCInfo.com profile

1888 births
English footballers
Manchester United F.C. players
Tottenham Hotspur F.C. players
Barrow A.F.C. players
Western Football League players
English Football League players
1956 deaths
British Army personnel of World War I
Royal Army Service Corps soldiers
Association football midfielders